Jandakot is a southern suburb of Perth, Western Australia, located within the City of Cockburn local government area. It is best known for Jandakot Airport that is situated entirely within the suburb, the airport being "the busiest general aviation airport in Australia in terms of aircraft movements", the sixth-busiest civilian airport in Australia in the fiscal year ending 30 June 2018, and in the 2011 fiscal year even the busiest civilian airport in Australia.

History 
Jandakot was originally named after Lake Jandakot, which was renamed lake Forrestdale in 1973. Maps of the Swan River Colony produced in the early 1830s show a lake of vast extent situated south west of Kelmscott.  The name of the first European to find the lake remains unknown but, in February 1833, Surveyor-General Septimus Roe found the size of the lake had been greatly exaggerated. It became well known as a watering place on the original track between the Canning River and Pinjarra and in 1844 its Aboriginal name was recorded as Jandacot by surveyor  Gregory, brother of Augustus Gregory. During subsequent years, the name was recorded variously as Jandicott, Jandakoot and Jandakott, but the spelling eventually adopted was Jandakot. The Aboriginal meaning of the word is said to be "place of the Whistling Eagle".

Geography 
It is bounded to the north by the Roe Highway, Kwinana Freeway to the west, Johnston Road to the east and to the south by Fraser Road, Jandakot Road, Solomon Road and Armadale Road.  The northeastern boundary of the suburb is also the municipal boundary of the City of Melville and the eastern boundary is the municipal boundary of the City of Canning.

Jandakot Airport 
Jandakot is best known for Jandakot Airport located within it. Jandakot Airport serves pilot testing and domestic plane flights. It is the busiest secondary airport in Australia. A popular feature is the cafe that overlooks the runway. The airport was opened in 1963.

In contrast to the tens of thousands of people now living in its vicinity, there is stiff opposition from the aviation community. The aforementioned land development company received a further setback in 2006 when the Minister for Transport wrote advising them that the airport was to be operated in its current location and in accordance with their lease from the Federal Government. This will include major re-development of the airside facilities including a new parallel 12/30 runway.

Climate 
Jandakot gets the comfortable climate of the Perth area with cool, wet winters and hot, dry summers.

References

External links

Suburbs in the City of Cockburn
Suburbs of Perth, Western Australia